Lecithocera neosticta is a moth in the family Lecithoceridae. It was described by Edward Meyrick in 1918. It is found in southern India.

The wingspan is about 14 mm. The forewings are fuscous irrorated (sprinkled) with darker. The discal stigmata are dark fuscous, the second short transverse. The hindwings are light grey.

References

Moths described in 1918
neosticta